Jacobus Rose is a film producer.

Selected filmography
 Anacondas: The Hunt for the Blood Orchid (2004)

References

External links

American film producers
Year of birth missing (living people)
Living people
Place of birth missing (living people)